I Can See Clearly Now is an album by the American singer Johnny Nash, released in 1972. The album includes two of his biggest hit singles, the title track ("I Can See Clearly Now") and "Stir It Up."  "I Can See Clearly Now" hit number one on the Billboard Hot 100 on November 4, 1972. Nash's backing band for the album was the Jamaican reggae group Fabulous Five Inc.

Track listing 
All tracks composed and arranged by Johnny Nash; except where indicated
"Stir It Up" (Bob Marley)
"That's the Way We Get By" (John "Rabbit" Bundrick)
"Guava Jelly" (Bob Marley)
"(It Was) So Nice While It Lasted" 
"Ooh Baby You've Been Good to Me" 
"You Poured Sugar on Me" (Bob Marley, Johnny Nash)
"I Can See Clearly Now" 
"Comma Comma" (Bob Marley)
"We're All Alike" (John "Rabbit" Bundrick)
"How Good It Is" 
"The Fish and the Alley of Destruction" (on original pressings), later replaced by "Cream Puff" (Margaret Nash)
"There Are More Questions Than Answers"

Charts

Personnel
Bernie O'Gorman, Jack Clegg, John Middleton, Siddey - engineers
Denis Waugh - cover photography
Tim Fulford-Brown - back cover photography
Marty Pekar - liner notes

References

Johnny Nash albums
1972 albums
Epic Records albums